Paul Greene (born June 2, 1974 in Wetaskiwin, Alberta, Canada) is a Canadian actor.

Career
Greene's first notable role was in the MyNetworkTV telenovela Wicked Wicked Games, where he was a series regular appearing in 40 episodes (out of 65) as attorney Benjamin Gray. His other acting credits include guest roles in series such as Freddie, Shark, The Wedding Bells, My Own Worst Enemy, and NCIS. Greene made his major-picture debut in Sofia Coppola's 2010 film Somewhere. He also has appeared in over 100 television commercials.  Green has also starred in several Hallmark movies over the past several years.  He is now a regular on Hallmark’s When Calls the Heart, playing Hope Valley’s town doctor.

Personal life
Greene lives in Los Angeles with his son Oliver (he is co-parenting with his ex-wife Angi Greene) and is engaged to his girlfriend, Kate Austin, to whom he proposed in May 2019 in Italy. He and Kate had a son (his second child) they named Austin together on December 12, 2021.  He loves playing beach volleyball with Ollie and watching the sunset; he also loves playing the guitar and singing (he writes his own songs). His mother is from the Netherlands; she was a nurse and has played in some of Paul's movies as an extra. His father died of ALS (Amyotrophic lateral sclerosis, also known as motor neurone disease or Lou Gehrig's disease) in 2014.

Filmography

Films

Television

References

External links
 
 

1974 births
21st-century Canadian male actors
Canadian male film actors
Canadian male television actors
Living people
Male actors from Alberta
People from Wetaskiwin